Nupur Sharma (born 23 April 1985) is an Indian politician. She was the national spokesperson of the Bharatiya Janata Party (BJP) until June 2022. Described as brash and articulate, she frequently represented BJP on Indian television debates as an official spokesperson. In June 2022, she was suspended from the party due to her comments about the Islamic prophet Muhammad and the age of his third wife, Aisha, at the time of their marriage and the consummation of the marriage.

Early life and education
Nupur Sharma was born in New Delhi in 1985. She comes from a family of civil servants and businessmen. Her mother is from Dehradun. 

Sharma studied in the Delhi Public School, Mathura Road. Later she graduated from the Hindu College at Delhi University with a Bachelor of Arts in economics. She later completed her Bachelor of Laws at Delhi University. While a student, she had joined the Akhil Bharatiya Vidyarthi Parishad (ABVP), the student wing of the Sangh Parivar, and won the presidency of the Delhi University Students Union in 2008, breaking an eight-year-long dry spell for the ABVP. A notable incident during her stint was the leading of an ABVP mob to heckle S. A. R. Geelani in a faculty seminar on 'Communalism, Fascism and Democracy: Rhetoric and Reality'. She appeared on a television show later that night and gave brash responses. 

After receiving a Master of Laws degree from the London School of Economics at the University of London, Sharma became a lawyer.

Political career
Sharma became a worker of the Bharatiya Janata Party (BJP) after returning from London in 2010–2011. In 2013, she became a member of the Delhi BJP's working committee. She is said to have worked with senior leaders like Arvind Pradhan, Arun Jaitley and Amit Shah. In 2015, at age 30, she was given the ticket for contesting against Arvind Kejriwal of the Aam Aadmi Party (AAP) in the 2015 Delhi Legislative Assembly election. She lost the contest by 31,000 votes.

Afterwards, she was appointed as an official spokesperson for the BJP's Delhi unit under Manoj Tiwari. In 2020, she was appointed as a national spokesperson of BJP under the presidency of J. P. Nadda. According to a Delhi BJP leader, even when she was part of the Delhi unit, she was often sent out for TV debates on national issues because of her legal acumen, sound knowledge of national issues, and bilingual skills. She was seen as young, energetic and brash, with regular appearances on television debates. She is recorded to have made several insulting comments on opposing panellists, causing outrage on twitter.

Comments about Muhammad

On 26 May 2022, Sharma participated in a debate on the Gyanvapi Mosque dispute on the Times Now television channel, during which she made controversial remarks regarding the age of Muhammad's wife Aisha at the time of their marriage and consummation of the marriage. A day later, the video clip of her comments were shared by Mohammed Zubair, the co-founder of Alt News, a fact-checking website, on social media to widespread criticism. Times Now deleted the video of the programme from its YouTube channel the following day. Nonetheless, Sharma defended her comments and accused Zubair of "heavily [editing]" the clip; she further claimed to have been receiving rape and death threats as a result, prompting Delhi Police to provide security cover. Journalists note that Sharma has made similar comments on several TV shows.

A police FIR (First Information Report) was registered against Sharma in Mumbai the next day on the grounds of "hurting religious sentiments". A series of FIRs followed in various towns around the country including one by parliamentarian Asaduddin Owaisi in Hyderabad. A bandh (shut down) was called by a Muslim organization in Kanpur to protest the remarks on 3 June, during which violence erupted with 40 people getting injured. In the meanwhile, Sharma's comments continued to be shared on social media especially in the Arab world. By 4 June, "insult to Prophet Mohammed" was among the top 10 trending hashtags in all the countries of Gulf Cooperation Council (GCC) and Turkey.

On 5 June, the Grand Mufti of Oman became the first significant figure from outside India to take issue with Sharma. Describing the remarks as "insolent and obscene rudeness", he called for a boycott of all Indian products and confiscation of all Indian investments in Oman. The Government of Qatar summoned the Indian ambassador and asked for an immediate condemnation and apology; the ambassador remarked Sharma to be a "fringe element" who did not reflect the views of the Government of India. The same day, Kuwait and Iran had the Indian envoys summoned and gave them protest notes.

By the evening of 5 June, Sharma was suspended from the BJP. The party statement said, "The BJP strongly denounces insults of any religious personalities of any religion." Afterwards, Sharma withdrew her remarks "unconditionally" but reiterated that they were in response to the "continuous insult and disregard" towards the Hindu deity Shiva. Many BJP supporters, including some BJP politicians, rallied behind her and criticised the party and the government for abandoning her and buckling under international pressure. Hashtags such as "#ShameOnBJP" and "#ISupportNupurSharma" trended on Twitter.

In June, a police team of Mumbai Police that had come to Delhi to question Sharma, was unable to find her despite camping for 5 days. On 20 June, in an email, she requested for a four-week extension to appear before the Kolkata Police due to threats against her life, after a complaint was lodged against her at the Narkeldanga police station.

On January 2023, she received a gun license following the death threats received after her remarks.

Notes

References

External links
 Pratik Sinha, twitter thread , 28 May 2022.
 Nupur Sharma Prophet Row: What happened on Times Now & why it will continue | TV Newsance 174 (in Hindi and English, satirical), Newslaundry, 11 June 2022.

1985 births
Living people
People from New Delhi
Bharatiya Janata Party politicians from Delhi
Delhi University alumni
Alumni of the London School of Economics
21st-century Indian women politicians